Pilodeudorix kafuensis is a butterfly in the family Lycaenidae. It is found in Zambia (north of Lusaka), the Democratic Republic of the Congo (Lualaba and Shaba), Malawi and south-western Tanzania. The habitat consists of primary forests.

References

External links
Die Gross-Schmetterlinge der Erde 13: Die Afrikanischen Tagfalter. Plate XIII 66 b

Butterflies described in 1910
Deudorigini